The Council of Toul was a Frankish synod convoked by Theudebald, King of Austrasia, that convened in Toul on 1 June 550. It is not known how many bishops attended. It extended to the ecclesiastical provinces of Reims and Trier and perhaps beyond. The diocese of Toul was a suffragan of Trier. The metropolitan bishop, Nicetius of Trier, was certainly in attendance.

Theudebald apparently convoked the council because Nicetius had begun excommunicating Frankish aristocrats who contracted marriages within the prohibited degree of consanguinity. The king wished to obtain a judgement against the metropolitan and a reversal of the excommunications.

The council is known from a letter of Bishop Mapinius of Reims in the Austrasian Letters collection. He had received an invitation to the council written in the king's name. He had not attended and was writing to explain his absence to Nicetius. He claimed that he had not learned of the purpose of the council in time.

Notes

Bibliography

550
Catholic Church councils held in France
Christianity in Francia